The Minister of Chance is a fantasy drama series written and produced by Dan Freeman of Radio Static. The Minister of Chance first appeared in Doctor Who webcast Death Comes to Time, played by Stephen Fry. The series won the 2013 Parsec Award for Best Speculative Fiction Audio Drama (Short Form). Stars of the audio drama series included Sylvester McCoy, Paul McGann and Jenny Agutter.

In 2014 a live action short was filmed based on The Prologue of the audio series, starring Paul McGann and Tim McInnerny. It was funded by the series' international fanbase. Soon after a Kickstarter campaign began in the hope of securing funding for episode one of a Minister of Chance movie. Crowdfunding for the movie was unsuccessful, with only half of the required funds being pledged.

The audio series was remastered in late 2020 and released as a series of 10 minute episodes.

A novel of the series was announced in 2022 by American publisher Arcbeatle Press.

Audio Series (2011-2013)

Synopsis 
In a world far from our own, Ambassador Durian of Sezuan (Paul McGann) is dispatched on a peace mission to the primitive island nation of Tanto, but things take a turn for the very, very sinister. In a nearby Inn, a mysterious stranger (Julian Wadham as the titular Minister) appears, then disappears through a miraculous portal in the forest (he “knows the formula for doors”). The inquisitive teenage barmaid, Kitty (Lauren Crace) follows him, with no shoes and only her superhuman strength to keep her company. Another world awaits, where they will be forced into an alliance to save the Universe, and beyond.

Episodes

Cast 
 The Minister of Chance - Julian Wadham
 Kitty - Lauren Crace
 Professor Canta - Jenny Agutter
 Durian - Paul McGann
 The Witch Prime - Sylvester McCoy
 The Sage of the Waves - Tamsin Greig
 The Summer King - Philip Glenister

Short film (2014)

Synopsis
Another world: Kitty is a barmaid at the Traveller's Rest in the occupied city of Tantillion. One night, a stranger walks in, and through a door and over the Frost Bridge between worlds - and Kitty follows him.

Cast 
 Durian - Paul McGann
 The King - Tim McInnerny
 Major Apper - Simon Bugg
 Spider Guard - Beccy Meany
 The Spider - Richard Oliver
 Princess Didi - Scribble
 Segway Rider - Lee Oulton

Novel (2022)

Synopsis 
“I know the formula for doors,” says the Minister, vanishing through the one he has just created in mid air. Teenage barmaid Kitty isn’t the sort to be dismissed easily, though. Armed only with her bad attitude, foul mouth and mysterious strength, she follows him through the glowing doorway, onto the frost bridge between worlds, and into adventure.

References

External links
 

2010s audio plays
Doctor Who spin-offs